is a rechargeable contactless smart card ticketing system for public transport in Hamamatsu, Japan, introduced by Enshū Railway (Entetsu) group, from August 20, 2004, succeeding the previous ET Card, a magnetic prepaid card. The name is an acronym of New Intelligence Card of Entetsu Personal and Smart System. Just like JR East's Suica or JR West's ICOCA, the card uses RFID technology developed by Sony corporation known as FeliCa. This was the first smart card in Japan that is usable for both railway lines and bus lines.

The card is usable for railways and buses by Enshū Railway, including Enshū Railway Line. However, it is not usable for community buses by municipalities there (excluding Ku-Ru-Ru and Iwata City Bus), or for e-wing, the bus for Chūbu Centrair International Airport. Currently, the card has no plan to have integrated services with other cards, such as Suica, ICOCA, LuLuCa or TOICA.

Types of cards
NicePass commuter's pass
Ordinary card
Child's card: For elementary school students or younger.
Student's card: For junior high school students or older.
Elderly customer's card: For 65-year-olds or older.
Handicapped customer's card

External links 
  Official website by Enshū Railway

Fare collection systems in Japan
Contactless smart cards